Davide Ballerini (born 21 September 1994 in Cantù) is an Italian cyclist, who currently rides for UCI WorldTeam . In May 2018, he was named in the startlist for the 2018 Giro d'Italia.

He is not related to former two-time Paris–Roubaix winner Franco Ballerini.

Major results

2012
 3rd  Road race, UEC European Junior Road Championships
2014
 1st Stage 8 Rás Tailteann
 3rd Overall Course de la Solidarité Olympique
1st  Young rider classification
2015
 3rd Trofeo Alcide Degasperi
 10th Piccolo Giro di Lombardia
2016
 4th Coppa dei Laghi-Trofeo Almar
 7th Piccolo Giro di Lombardia
 9th Ronde van Vlaanderen Beloften
2017
 1st  Mountains classification, Tirreno–Adriatico
 9th Memorial Marco Pantani
 10th Coppa Bernocchi
2018
 1st Memorial Marco Pantani
 1st Trofeo Matteotti
 1st Prologue Sibiu Cycling Tour
 3rd Gran Piemonte
 3rd GP Industria & Artigianato di Larciano
 5th Giro dell'Appennino
2019
 1st  Road race, European Games
 1st  Mountains classification, Tour of California
 4th Brussels Cycling Classic
2020
 1st Stage 5 Tour de Pologne
 2nd Road race, National Road Championships
 2nd Brussels Cycling Classic
 4th Druivenkoers Overijse
 6th Road race, UEC European Road Championships
2021
 1st Omloop Het Nieuwsblad
 Tour de la Provence
1st  Points classification
1st Stages 1 & 2
 10th Primus Classic
2022
 1st Coppa Bernocchi
 1st Stage 4 Tour de Wallonie
 9th UCI World Gravel Championships
2023
 6th Omloop Het Nieuwsblad

Grand Tour general classification results timeline

References

External links

1994 births
Living people
Italian male cyclists
Cyclists at the 2019 European Games
European Games medalists in cycling
European Games gold medalists for Italy
People from Cantù
Cyclists from the Province of Como
21st-century Italian people